The second Season of X Factor started on 30 August 2011. The auditions were held in April/May 2011. The show was broadcast every Tuesday and Sunday (only the Auditions and the Superbootcamp). The Judges were Sarah Connor, Das Bo  and Till Brönner .

There were four phases:
Auditions
Bootcamp
Judge's House
Live Shows

This year twelve acts had been a part of the live shows, and not nine. Furthermore, from the first to sixth live show the judges decided which act had to leave the X Factor. In the final were three acts.

Selection process

Applications and auditions
The first appeal for applicants for series 2 was broadcast during series 1 on 9 November 2010. Auditions in front of the judges for series 2 took place in Cologne, Berlin, Munich and Hamburg. After the acts sing in front of the judges, they could be eliminated or go through to the Bootcamp. The auditions were broadcast on 30 August, 4 September, 6 September, 11 September, 13 September, 18 September and 20 September 2011.

Superbootcamp
The episodes of superbootcamp were broadcast on 25 September and on 27 September 2011. It showed 150 acts attend to the superbootcamp. The acts were split into 3 groups, 16-24s, Over 25s and Groups, in which to perform at Mitsubishi Electric Halle, and each group was given one song by the judges: the 16-24s sang "Born This Way", the Over 25s sang "True Colors" and the Groups sang "Could It Be Magic". The judges then went on to cut over 80 acts, but called some soloists back, who were asked if they were interested in forming groups. All agreed and were workshopped to see which singers would work well together. They formed two groups. Then eight groups of each category were built and they fought in a battle, only one act of each duet came into the next round. Sometimes the judges end both through, but sometimes no one got through. The judges then chose the top 24 acts, based on these performances.

Judges' houses
Judges' houses, the final part of the selection process, was filmed in the summer 2011. The episodes were aired on 4 October 2011 and on 11 October. Judges were given their categories at the end of the "Superbootcamp". Brönner the Over 25s, Connor the Groups, and Das Bo the 16-24s. Mimi Müller-Westernhagen assisted Brönner in Edinburgh, Connor was accompanied by Jason Derulo in Berlin, and Das Bo received help from Melanie C in Hamburg. At judges' houses each act performed one song for their mentor and his/her guest, before the last performance, they practiced the song with their mentor and his/her guest.

The 24 acts who reached the Judges' Houses:
Over 25: Rufus Martin, Sara Mosquera, Sven Kompaß, Gladys Mwachiti, Frederik Waldner, David Pfeffer, Mario Loritz, Volker Schlag
16-24: Nadir Alami, Kassim Auale, Monique Simon, Jennifer Hans, Martin Madeja, Barne Heimbucher, Sebastian Schmidt, Raffaela Wais
Groups: Boyz II Hot, Different Alike, BenMan, Nica & Joe, High Intention, The Ord Brothers, Soultrip, Twelve Signs Up

The twelve eliminated acts were:
Over 25: Sara Mosquera, Sven Kompaß, Frederik Waldner, Mario Loritz
16-24: Nadir Alami, Jennifer Hans, Barne Heimbucher, Sebastian Schmidt
Groups: Different Alike, High Intention, The Ord Brothers, Twelve Signs Up

Contestants

Key:

 – Winner
 – Runner-up
 – Third Place

BenMan consists of Benjamin (19) & Manuel (18).
Boyz II Hot consists of Daniel (18) & Nathanaele (19).
Nica & Joe consists of Joseph (32) & Veronika (24).
Soultrip consists of Blago (24), Martin (27) & Nunzio (24).

Results table 

Contestants' colour key:
{|
|-
| – Over 25s   
|-
| – 16–24s     
|-
| – Groups
|-
| – Bottom two or three
|-
| – Contestant was in the bottom three but received the fewest votes and was immediately eliminated
|-
| – Contestant became the Runner-Up
|-
| – Highest Vote of a Week
|}

Live show details

Week 1 (18 October)
Theme: The Big Live Opening
Special Guest: Leona Lewis ("Run")
Group Performance: "Beautiful Day" 
Two acts were eliminated from the series first results show. The three acts with the fewest public votes were announced as the bottom three and then the act with the fewest votes was automatically eliminated. The remaining two acts then performed in the final showdown and faced the judges' votes.

Judge's vote to eliminate
 Brönner: Boys II Hot - said Monique has a better voice and more potential to sing
 Connor: Monique Simon - backed on her own act, Boys II Hot
 Das Bo: Boys II Hot - backed on his own act, Monique Simon

Week 2 (25 October)
Theme: The biggest radio hits
Special Guest: James Morrison ("I Won't Let You Go") and Madcon ("Glow" / "Freaky Like Me" / "Helluva Nite")

Judge's vote to eliminate
 Brönner: Monique Simon - backed his own act Gladys Mwachiti
 Connor: Gladys Mwachiti - gave no reason
 Das Bo: Gladys Mwachiti - backed his own act Monique Simon

Week 3 (1 November)
Theme: Wild 80s
Special Guest: Kelly Clarkson ("Mr. Know It All")
Over 25s Group Performance: "Ain't No Sunshine"

Judge's vote to eliminate
 Brönner: Kassim Auale - backed his own act Volker Schlag
 Connor: Volker Schlag - because he is the weaker singer of both acts
 Das Bo: Volker Schlag - backed his own act Kassim Auale

Week 4 (8 November)
Theme: Party
Special Guest: Taio Cruz ("Hangover")
16-24s Group Performance: "Kids"

Judge's vote to eliminate
 Brönner: Kassim Auale - gave no reason
 Connor: Monique Simon - because of her 3rd time in the bottom 2
 Das Bo: Kassim Auale - gave no reason

Week 5 (15 November)
Theme: Indecent Proposal
Special guest: Justin Bieber ("Mistletoe") / Pitbull ("Rain Over Me")
Groups category Group Performance: "Crazy"
Two acts were eliminated from the series fifth results show. The three acts with the fewest public votes were announced as the bottom three and then the act with the fewest votes was automatically eliminated. The remaining two acts then performed in the final showdown and faced the judges' votes.

Judge's vote to eliminate
 Brönner: BenMan - said Raffaela has a better voice
 Connor: Raffaela Wais - backed on her own act, BenMan
 Das Bo: BenMan - backed on his own act, Raffaela Wais

Week 6 (22 November)
Theme: Loud vs. Quiet
Special Guest: Dick Brave and the Backbeats
For the first time this series, each contestant performed two songs.

Judge's vote to eliminate
 Brönner: Monique Simon
 Connor: Monique Simon
 Das Bo: Monique Simon

Week 7 (29 November)
Theme: Rock meets Soul (One song is chosen by the act and one is chosen by the mentor.)
Special Guest: Jason Derülo ("Don't Wanna Go Home"/"It Girl") & Tim Bendzko ("Wenn Worte meine Sprache wären"/"Nur noch kurz die Welt retten")
The act with the fewest votes was directly eliminated from the competition.

Week 8 (6 December)
Theme: Final
Celebrity Performers: Kelly Rowland ("Down for Whatever"), Melanie C ("Let There Be Love"), Michael Bublé ("Christmas (Baby Please Come Home)")
Group Performance (all 12 acts): "Raise Your Glass"

After the first elimination, Nica & Joe sang for the last time "The Prayer".

Ratings

References

External links
 Official German X Factor site

Germany 02
2011 German television seasons